Bakersfield College (BC) is a public community college in Bakersfield, California. BC serves about 27,800 students each semester or 31,000 annually, and offers associate degrees, certificate programs, and is one of fifteen California Community Colleges offering a baccalaureate degree. It is part of the Kern Community College District (KCCD), which is itself part of the California Community Colleges system.

History 
Founded in 1913 as Bakersfield Junior College, the school was initially housed on the campus of Bakersfield High School (then Kern County Union High School). In 1947, the school dropped "Junior" from its name. In 1956, Bakersfield College moved to its current location "on the hill" in northeast Bakersfield on the "Panorama Bluffs" that overlook the prolific Kern River oil field.

Campus 

Organization and administration 
BC is part of the Kern Community College District (KCCD).

Academics 
BC serves about 25,000 students each semester.

Student life

Newspaper 
The Renegade Rip is the student-run newspaper within the journalism department at BC. Published biweekly, The Rip currently has a circulation of approximately 4,000. An online edition is also available. The Rip is a regular contender and recipient of JACC (Journalism Association of Community Colleges) awards at both the state and regional levels and in 2003-2004 won the Associated Collegiate Press National Pacemaker Award. They are a member of the Journalism Association of Community Colleges and compete in the Southern California region.

Rip reporters and photographers cover the campus. The students cover topics ranging from crime on campus, to student profiles, sports and local entertainment. The tradition of The Renegade Rip has always been to chase news stories and focus on what affects the student body at BC and the community of Bakersfield as a whole.

Performing arts
The Renegade Pep Band supports the college's athletic teams.

Golden Empire Performing Arts is a non-profit 501(c)(3) account of the Bakersfield College Foundation that supports the Bakersfield College Drumline and the Golden Empire Drum and Bugle Corps.

Athletics 

The college's athletic teams are known as the Renegades ('Gades). The team competes as a member of the California Community College Athletic Association (CCCAA) in the Western State Conference (WSC) for all sports except football and wrestling, which compete in Southern California Football Association (SCFA) and Southern California Wrestling Association (SCWA). The college has an extensive athletics program with 20 varsity teams, including men's and women's basketball, men's and women's cross country, men's and women's golf, football, soccer, volleyball, wrestling, baseball, softball, men's and women's tennis, men's and women's track and field, and men's and women's swimming.

Renegades football has a long tradition of success in Junior College-level competition, and plays out of the 20,000-seat, on-campus Memorial Stadium.

Notable people 

 Rishard Matthews, NFL wide receiver
 Brandon Banks, CFL wide receiver for the Hamilton Tiger-Cats
 Robert Beltran, film and television actor, best known for playing Chakotay on Star Trek: Voyager
 Vern Burke, former NFL tight end, Oregon Sports Hall of Famer
 Tyrone Crawford, NFL defensive end
 Chris DeFrance, CFL wide receiver
 Ric Drasin, former professional wrestler, designer of the original Gold's Gym logo and the World Gym gorilla logo. 
 Phil Dumatrait, former MLB pitcher
 David Dunn, former NFL wide receiver
 Jean Fuller, politician serving in the California State Senate
 Frank Gifford, Pro Football Hall of Fame and sports commentator
 Dallas Grider, former high school and college football coach
 Liz Gorman, football player in the Lingerie Football League
 Gerald Haslam, News and book author
 Joe Hernandez, former NFL and CFL wide receiver
 George Jones (American football), former NFL running back.
 Junior Kennedy, 1968-1975 MLB second baseman with the Cincinnati Reds and Chicago Cubs
 Colby Lewis, former MLB pitcher
 Guy Madison, film and television actor
 Billy Mamaril, Filipino professional basketball player
 Richard Miles, former ambassador 
 Spain Musgrove, former NFL defensive tackle
 Brennan Newberry, NASCAR driver
 Mark Nichols, former NFL wide receiver
 Charles Noland, professional actor
 Rocky Rasley, former NFL guard
 Greg Robinson, former head coach, Syracuse University football; two-time Super Bowl-winning defensive coordinator of Denver Broncos
 Michael Rubio, politician
 Carl Smith, former offensive coordinator of the Jacksonville Jaguars
 Taj Smith, CFL wide receiver for the Saskatchewan Roughriders
 Andre Spencer (1964–2020), basketball player, former NBA player
 Jeremy Staat, former NFL defensive end
 Walter W. Stiern, former California State Senator 
 Jim Stiger, former NFL running back
 John Tarver, former running back for the New England Patriots
 Mike Waufle, NFL defensive line coach
 Dick Witcher, former NFL wide receiver
 Jake Woods, MLB pitcher
 Delbert E. Wong, first Chinese-American judge in the continental United States
 Louis Wright, former NFL cornerback

References

External links
 Official website
 Official athletics website

 
1913 establishments in California
California Community Colleges
Education in Bakersfield, California
Educational institutions established in 1913
Schools accredited by the Western Association of Schools and Colleges
Universities and colleges in Kern County, California